"Almost" is a song by the American rock band Bowling for Soup. It was released on 4 January 2005 as the second single of the group's 2004 album A Hangover You Don't Deserve.

It tells the story of a young adult who goes through many "almost" experiences during his life, from almost making out with the homecoming queen to almost getting addicted to drugs. He shows remorse for not "making his move" earlier, and he "almost" wishes she loved him too.

Music video
A music video was released in the week of 7 March 2005, directed by Frank Borin and Ryan Smith (also known as "Smith N Borin"). The video shows the band in high school, attempting to get into sports in order to impress the girls there. This footage is intertwined with the band performing inside a high school gymnasium.

Charts

References

External links
 

2004 songs
2005 singles
Bowling for Soup songs
Songs written by Butch Walker
Songs written by Jaret Reddick
Song recordings produced by Butch Walker